The Hôtel Perrinet de Jars is a listed hôtel particulier in Paris, France. It is located at 33 rue du Faubourg Saint-Honoré in the 8th arrondissement of Paris.

History
The building was built during the 18th century. It has been listed as a monument historique since 1928.

From 1920 onward, it has been the clubhouse of the Cercle de l'Union interalliée, a private social and dining club. The club had acquired the building from Henri de Rothschild in 1920.

References

External links
 
 Cercle de l'Union interalliée - official website

Perrinet de Jars
Buildings and structures in the 8th arrondissement of Paris